Maiestas maculata is a species of bug from the Cicadellidae family that is endemic to India. It was originally placed within Recilia, but a 2009 revision moved it to Maiestas. Subsequently, a 2011 revision found that M. prabha (also formerly placed in Recilia) was a junior synonym of M. maculata.

References

Insects described in 1930
Endemic fauna of India
Hemiptera of Asia
Maiestas